Echizen-Takefu Station may refer to:
 Echizen-Takefu Station (JR West), a planned railway station on the Hokuriku Shinkansen
 Takefu-shin Station, formerly called Echizen-Takefu Station, a railway station on the Fukui Railway Fukubu Line